Zalău (unofficial and former official name:  (or ,) is the seat of Sălaj County, Romania. In 2011, its estimated population was 56,202.

History

Ancient times
Zalău was the crossing point between Central Europe and Transylvania, along the so-called "Salt Route". 

Archaeological discoveries revealed evidence of human existence in this area since the Neolithic, approx. 6500 years ago. Dacian coins found in archaeological perimeters of the city central area and on the Valea Mâții, west of the city, plus important items belonging to Roman culture, are evidence of free Dacian continuity in this area and of developing economic relations with the Roman ancient city of Porolissum.

Just north from the border, on the actual Zalău city area were the free Dacians tribes, and to the east, south-east (of Meseș Mountains) were Roman border fortifications, towers, walls, ditches and defense sides.

Middle Ages
The first written mention about Zalău, was in the "Gesta Hungarorum", also called the "Chronicle of Anonymous" (probably notary of the King Béla III of Hungary), published around year 1200. According to this source, Zalău settlement would have been there as early as around 900. Later, Zalău is referred to as Villa Ziloc in 1220, Zylac in 1246, Zylah in 1282, Zyloh and oppidum Zylah in 1318, Zila in 1601, Zilahu in 1808, Sziláj / Szilágyi in 1839, Szilaju in 1850, and Zalău / Sziláju / Walthenberg in 1854. After the great Mongol invasion, which destroyed the city in 1241, Zalău came in 1246 under the administration of the Catholic Bishopric of Oradea. The trusteeship was maintained until 1542, when Zalău became part of Principality of Transylvania.

On 1 August 1473 Matthias Corvinus, king of Hungary and Bohemia, acknowledged Zalău as a market town for the first time (called oppidum Zilah – Zilah fort), a privilege that freed the city from the county domination, granted its citizens the right of free trade and gave it a larger degree of economic autonomy.

At the end of the 16th century, the city had an independent administrative leadership, composed of 33 elected senators (one of whom was the mayor), a notary, a registrar and a treasurer.

Other important events in the development of the city occurred in 1571 during the reign of Prince Istvan Bathory and in 1600 under the reign of Michael the Brave. After Transylvania had been annexed to the Habsburg Empire, the city experienced an economic decline due to the infusion of products from Western Europe.

After Michael the Brave's victory in the Battle of Guruslău on 3 August 1601, Zalău received administrative, legislative, fiscal and military own rules, which provided real autonomy freedoms to citizens. A chronicle from the 17th century, first mentioned the main crafts of city residents: belt-makers, potters, wheelwrights, shoemakers, butchers, tailors, blacksmiths, carpenters, hat makers and armorers.

The city was under the rule Principality of Transylvania between 1526 and 1660. It was also controlled by the Ottomans between 1660 and 1692, the city being part of Varat Eyalet.

The Calvinist college was formed in the first half of the 17th century.

On 9 November 1714, Charles XII of Sweden rested for a night in a building on Király street (now named after Corneliu Coposu) with an acquaintance György Zoványi as is indicated by a notice still on the house.

Until the administrative reform of 1876, the city had been the seat of Közép-Szolnok for centuries.

Modern times

Zalău is one of the most important urban centers in the region. It had a Reformed college (Wesselényi College), a township school for civil service (for boys only), and a national civil school (for girls only). It had the largest hospital in the region and a tax revenue office.

In 1850, it held a population of 4,294 and, in 1910–8,062 (7,477 Hungarians, 19 Germans, 529 Romanians and 23 belonging to other ethnic groups). By religion, there were 1,333 Roman Catholics, 873 Greek Catholics, 5,363 members of the Reformed Church, and 415 Jews. The city had 1,427 households, and most of its inhabitants were employed by the manufacturing industry. The Reformed Church was built in 1246. It is one of the city's oldest buildings and one of the largest in Eastern Europe.

In 1876, Zalău became the seat of the Szilágy County. After the proclamation of the Union of Transylvania with Romania (1 December 1918), by the Treaty of Trianon Zalău has been part of Romania – except between 1940 until the end of World War II, when Northern Transylvania became part of Hungary as a result of the Second Vienna Award. On 8 September 1940, upon arrival in Zalău, the Hungarian Army killed 10 people just outside the city; in the following days, the Nușfalău, Treznea, and Ip massacres were perpetrated in nearby villages.

Between 1892 and 1896, one of the most famous Hungarian poets Endre Ady attended the Protestant school in Zalău (since 1957, there has been a statue of Endre Ady in front of the school). The poet also published his first poem in the local newspaper "Szilágy" on 22 March 1896. A memorial plaque on the frontage of the building where he lived reminiscents of Ady Endre's time spent there.

At the end of the 19th century, Lajos Szikszai donated his private collection to the municipality and the first museum in Zalău was created. An exhibition was also organized in 1926, but the Zalău County Museum was officially inaugurated in 1951. On 9 July 1981, a new section of the Zalău County Museum was inaugurated and was named the "Ioan Sima" Arts Gallery.

The "Central Library," owning 7,000 Romanian and Hungarian books, was opened on the 23 August 1950. In 1952 it became "Rayon Library," coordinating all the Zalău Rayon libraries. In 1957 it took the name of Ioniță Scipione Bădescu. It became the "County Library" with the administrative reform of February 1968.

As of the end of the 1960s, the city became a regional industrial center for the first time, which was heavily impacted by the Systematization process. Industrial factories like Armătura Zalău, Silcotub Zalău and Anvelope Silvania (recently bought by Michelin) hired thousands of workers, which sparked an increase in population as a result. The population influx gradually led to changes in the ethnic structure with the Romanians being now the majority and the Hungarians reduced to a minority. However, in many of the surrounding communes, the ethnic structure still remained unchanged (for example Vârșolț) are still populated by Hungarians; on the other hand, nearby villages such as Marin have a 100% ethnic Romanian population, basically unchanged for more than a century. In the 1970s with the working-class population expanding, housing estates of high-rise blocks of flats were built in both the centre and the outskirts of the town.

In 2007, due to the negligence of the local natural gas distributor, a gas accumulation produced an explosion that led to casualties and significant material damage.

Today Zalău is crossed by European road E81 and the national road DN1F. A new motorway (the Transylvania Highway) is being built to connect Zalău to Western Europe. The town has two nationally accredited University colleges, a public library, one museum, an art gallery, more than four hotels, a motel, and two student halls of residence.

Geography 
Zalău is in the central part of Sălaj County, in Zalău watershed where the depression of the same name and the Meseș Peak meet.

It neighbours Țara Maramureșului and the county of Satu Mare, in the northwestern part of the historical region of Transylvania, which in the past was a mainly independent small state but since 1918 has belonged to Romania (except between September 1940 and October 1944, when it was under the administration of Hungary following the Second Vienna Award). Whether Zalău lies in Crișana or Transylvania is still a matter of debate because, geographically, Zalău lies on the eastern border of Crișana.

It lies along the bank of the small river Zalău, between three narrow valleys in the Meseș Mountains. It is the county seat and the largest city in Sălaj County.

This includes the one village it administers, Stâna (Felsőnyárló), situated south-east of Meseș, in the hydrographic basin of Agrij. Măgura Stânii has .

Sights 
The most important of the 24 monuments and buildings in the county capital of Zalău are: "Transilvania" (theatre in 1895), the city hall (court and seat of the prefects office in 1889), the Roman Catholic Church (1878), the reformed church (1904–1907), the Greek Catholic "Dormition of the Theotokos Church" (1930–1934), the Orthodox deanery (built in the late 19th century), the Historical Museum (built about 1900 – casino of the artisans fellowship), the primary school "Simion Bărnuțiu" (girls' school in 1895) and the National College Silvania (Reformed College in 1860), all these being valuable urbanistic elements for the historical and cultural patrimony of the land. The famous statuary group Wesselényi Monument of the heroic Hungarian nobleman with the same name (1902) by János Fadrusz, and the bust made in the honour of Simion Bărnuțiu by Romul Ladea are worth visiting as well.

Zalău hosts lively pageants each year, including a summer festival known as the "Zalău Days". There is a statue of Baron Wesselényi in Iuliu Maniu Square of the town center; the Tuhutum Memorial (both made by János Fadrusz in 1902); the Zalău County Museum of History and Art displays artifacts ranging from neolithic times to modern times, with a focus on the Roman period and hosts works of modern art. There are several churches, including the Calvinist Cathedral, which is one of the most beautiful and largest in Transylvania.

Population 
The population of Zalău went through important evolutions throughout times (see above), and at present the data indicated by the 2011 census are the following: 56,202 inhabitants.

From an ethnic point of view, according to the census in 2002 the population had the following structure: 80.89% Romanians, 17.50% Hungarians, 1.36% Romani, 0.25% others. At the 2011 census, Zalău had 76.5% Romanians, 15.4% Hungarians and 1.4% Romani. For 6.5% no ethnicity information was available.

Ethnic structure

Confessional structure

Etymology 
The location had various names: "Ziloc" in 1220, "Oppidum Zilah" in 1473, "Zila" in 1601, and "Zilahu" and "Zalahu" in the 19th century, or forms of German toponimy "Waltenberg" and "Zillenmarkt".

Politics 

At the end of the 16th century, the town had an independent administrative rule made of 33 elected senators, from whom one of them was the mayor. There were also a notary, an archivist and a treasurer.

Formed by 21 members, the Local Council has the following attributes: to approve the local budget, loans, credit transfers and the means of the use of the budgetary reserve; it establishes local taxes as well as special taxes; to elect the vice-mayors, to decide on the staff of attendants number.

2012 election 

The Zalău Council, elected in the 2012 local government elections, was made up of 21 councilors, with the following party composition: 3-Democratic Alliance of Hungarians in Romania, 12-Social Liberal Union, 3-Democratic Liberal Party, 3-People's Party – Dan Diaconescu. Mayor Radu Căpîlnășiu was re-elected.

2008 elections 
Mayor Radu Căpîlnășiu was elected first time in 2004 as member of Democratic Party (PD) and re-elected in 2008 and 2012 as member of National Liberal Party (PNL).

The Zalău Municipal Council, elected in the 2008 local government elections, was made up of 21 councilors, with the following party composition:

2004 elections 
The Zalău Municipal Council, elected in the 2004 local government elections, was made up of 21 councillors, with the following party composition:

Sports 
The city has a women's handball team, named HC Zalău, that is coached by Gheorghe Tadici, the former head coach of Romania's national handball team.

Media 
Graiul Sălajului, Magazin Sălăjean, Sălajeanul, Țara Silvaniei (1940, 1989), Năzuința (1960–1989), Sălajul Orizont, Gazeta de Duminică, Glasul copilăriei, Repere transilvane, Sălajul european, Acta mvsei porolissensis, Caiete silvane, Limes, Árkád, Szilágy, Szilágyság.

Online media 

 Zalau24.ro On scene news reports happening in Zalau or in Salaj county

Notable natives and residents 
 Endre Ady (1877–1919), Hungarian poet
 Dacian Cioloș (born 1969), politician, Prime Minister of Romania
 Alexandru Dragomir (1916–2002), Romanian philosopher
 Ramona Farcău (born 1979), Romanian handball player
 Virgil D. Gligor (born 1949), Romanian-American professor of electrical and computer engineering 
 Eduard Hellvig (born 1974), director of the Romanian Intelligence Service  
 Iuliu Maniu (1873–1953), Romanian politician
 Florian Pop (born 1952), Romanian-American mathematician
 Codruț Șereș (born 1969), Romanian engineer and politician
 Gheorghe Tadici (born 1952), Romanian handball coach
 Talida Tolnai (born 1979), Romanian handball player
 Miklós Wesselényi (1796–1850), Hungarian statesman
 Gyula Zilahy (1859–1938), Hungarian stage and film actor

International relations

Twin towns – Sister cities 
Zalău is twinned with:

  Imola, Italy 
  Sandwell, United Kingdom 
  Kamianets-Podilskyi, Ukraine 
  Szentendre, Hungary

Climate
Zalău has a humid continental climate (Cfb in the Köppen climate classification).

Photo gallery

Works 
 János Kovács Kuruc, Zilah vallási életéről, In: Limes, 2000, 3, nr. 1–2, p. 138–143.
 Éva Lakóné Hegyi; Wagner, Ernő. A zilahi kalandosok, In: EM, 2001, 63, nr. 1–2, p. 30–41.
 Florin Mirgheșiu, Modernitatea Zalăului. In: AMPZ, 2001, 2, nr. 4, p. 11–19.
 Moroti, Elisabeta. Scurtă privire istorică asupra dezvoltării economice a orașului Zalău. In: AMPZ, 2001, 2, nr. 4, p. 36–39.
 Municipiul Zalău. Prezentare. In: AMPZ, 2002, 3, nr. 7–8, p. 154–161.
 Elena Muscă, Meșteșugari zălăuani și locul lor în structurile administrației publice locale, In: AMP, 2003, 25, p. 325–332.
 L. Nicoară; Pușcaș, Angelica. Rolul municipiului Zalău în zona de contact dintre depresiunea Transilvaniei și Dealurile de Vest. In: Studia geogr., 1999, 44, nr. 1, p. 99–112.

References

External links 

  https://web.archive.org/web/20090117041059/http://www.salaj.insse.ro/main.php
  http://www.insse.ro/cms/files/pdf/ro/cap2.pdf

 
Cities in Romania
Populated places in Sălaj County
Capitals of Romanian counties
Localities in Crișana